Mtwapa is a town located in Kenya's  Kilifi County. It is close to the Mombasa Marine National Park and Reserve and Jumba la Mtwana. Two informal settlements in Mtwapa, Majengo and Mzambarauni, are participating in the UN-HABITAT Participatory Slum Upgrading Program. It is run by resident committees and aims to provide every household with drinking water and a toilet.

Mtwapa is also a destination for sex tourism, including child sex tourism.

Mtwapa is a cosmopolitan town  having a sizeable population of foreign  residents  and non residents  mostly of Caucasian origin. 
The town is known for a vibrant nightlife.
It also hosts  a large number of hospitality  joints, priced fairly, ranging from lodges, hotels Air BnBs and leased apartments.

The population of Mtwapa 
The population growth is shown in the following table. 
{| border="0" cellspacing="0" cellpadding="0"
| valign="top" |

Climate 
Mtwapa has a tropical wet and dry climate (Köppen: As). The rainiest months are April, May, June and October–November.

Jumba la Mtwana 
Jumba la Mtwana is the site of archaeological relics, lying close to the Mtwapa Creek. It dates back to  the fourteenth century.

In popular culture 
Part of the events in the story of 2017 "Consummation in Mombasa" (by Andrei Gusev) takes place in Mtwapa. The plot describes the Catholic wedding in Mombasa of the main characters (Russian writer Andy and the girl Jennifer, who was born in Kenya) and then their life in Mtwapa.

See also
Historic Swahili Settlements
Swahili architecture

References

 

Swahili people
Swahili city-states
Swahili culture
Populated places in Coast Province
Mombasa
Kilifi County
Monuments and memorials in Kenya